Ice stalactite may refer to:
 Ice stalactites – a stalactite ice formation in a cave
 Brinicle – an icicle forming under sea ice